Mongolian National Democratic Party shortened as MNDP (in Mongolian Монгол Үндэсний Ардчилсан Нам, shortened as MYAH) was a Mongolian political party established in 1992 with the merger of Mongolian National Progress Party and Mongolian Democratic Party (1990).

The party won 35 seats as a member of the Democratic Union Coalition in the 1996 election. It represented conservative and liberal positions.

The party continued under this name until 1999 when it dissolved itself after becoming a co-founder of the Democratic Party (in Mongolian Ардчилсан нам or Ardchilsan Nam).

See also
Politics of Mongolia
List of political parties in Mongolia

References

Defunct political parties in Mongolia
Political parties established in 1992